South Negril Point is the westernmost point of mainland Jamaica. It is located a little south of the resort town of Negril and a little north of Negril Lighthouse.

See also
List of countries by westernmost point

References

Headlands of Jamaica
Extreme points of Jamaica
Geography of Westmoreland Parish